John Dominic Lynch (8 July 1946 in Sydney, Australia – 25 May 2021 in Port Vila, Vanuatu) was a linguist specializing in Oceanic languages. He was an emeritus professor of Pacific Languages and the former Director of the Pacific Languages Unit at the University of the South Pacific in Port Vila, Vanuatu.

Career
Prior to moving to Vanuatu, he had served at the University of Papua New Guinea for 21 years, the last five as vice-chancellor. His areas of focus were the languages of Vanuatu, the history of languages of the Pacific, pidgin and creole languages, language change, dictionaries and orthography design.

He was the editor of the journal Oceanic Linguistics from 2007 to 2019.

References

External links
Pacific Languages Unit

1946 births
2021 deaths
Linguists from Australia
People from Sydney
Linguists of Oceanic languages
Academic staff of the University of Papua New Guinea
Academic staff of the University of the South Pacific